Vicky J. Meretsky is an American professor of biology and Director of Environmental Masters Programs at Indiana University Bloomington.

Education 
Meretsky received a Bachelor of Sciences at Cornell University in 1980. In 1988, Meretsky completed her first Master's degree in Wildlife Ecology at Humboldt State University in Arcata, California and pursued a second Master's degree in Statistics from the University of Arizona in 1993. Meretsky's final degree was her Doctorate in 1995 at the University of Arizona, where she studied the foraging ecology of Egyptian vultures in the Negev Desert.

Career and research 
Meretsky is currently a professor at Indiana University Bloomington (IUB), teaching conservation biology, climate change impacts on natural resources, and graduate statistics. Meretsky has held several adjunct positions in various departments since she became an affiliated faculty member in 1998. Previously, Meretsky taught as an adjunct professor at the University of Arizona from 1996 until 2001.

Meretsky has also worked on multiple occasions as a consultant and specialist for outside universities and governmental organizations, including wetlands consultancy for the Department of Justice. Before her employment at IU, she worked for the U.S. Fish and Wildlife Service as a research biologist studying endangered species and ecosystem management in the Grand Canyon.

Meretsky is interested in both the science and policy aspects of conservationism, studying the effects of anthropogenic climate change on single species as well as broader impacts on ecosystems and whole regions. Her interests include, but are not limited to, "conservation planning, ecology of rare species, integrating ecosystem and endangered species management with adaptive management, and impacts of climate change on each." Meretsky has spent time studying numerous species within and without of the United States, including Egyptian vultures, the humpback chub, and the California condor, where she was involved in measuring the effects of the insecticide DDT on condor reproduction.

Awards and honors
She is a five-time winner of the Trustees Teaching Award at IU, three-time winner of the Teaching Excellence Recognition Award, and three-time winner of IU's School of Public Environmental Affairs (SPEA) Outstanding Teaching Award. In addition, she has received several grants for her continued research, including two EPA-funded National Lakes Assessment grants as well as a $400,000 teaching grant from the Department of Education for the funding of a US-Russia Global Environmental Issues Research and Study Program.

Publications 
 Meretsky, V. J., Snyder, N. F., Beissinger, S. R., Clendenen, D. A., & Wiley, J. W. (2000). "Demography of the California Condor: implications for reestablishment". Conservation Biology, 14(4), 957–967.
 Stevens, L. E., Ayers, T. J., Bennett, J. B., Christensen, K., Kearsley, M. J., Meretsky, V. J., ... & Springer, A. E. (2001). "Planned flooding and Colorado River riparian trade‐offs downstream from Glen Canyon Dam, Arizona". Ecological Applications, 11(3), 701–710.
 Stevens, L. E., & Meretsky, V. J. (eds.). (2008). Aridland springs in North America: ecology and conservation. University of Arizona Press.
 Meretsky, V. J., Wegner, D. L., & Stevens, L. E. (2000). "Balancing endangered species and ecosystems: a case study of adaptive management in Grand Canyon". Environmental Management, 25(6), 579–586.
 Zengel, S. A., Meretsky, V. J., Glenn, E. P., Felger, R. S., & Ortiz, D. (1995). "Cienega de Santa Clara, a remnant wetland in the Rio Colorado delta (Mexico): vegetation distribution and the effects of water flow reduction". Ecological Engineering, 4(1), 19–36.

See also

References 

Living people
Year of birth missing (living people)
Cornell University alumni
California State Polytechnic University, Humboldt alumni
University of Arizona alumni
Indiana University Bloomington faculty
American women scientists
21st-century American women